Holman K. Wheeler was a prolific Massachusetts architect. Wheeler (working alone or with partners) is responsible for designing more than 400 structures in the city of Lynn alone, including the iconic High Rock Tower which is featured prominently on the Lynn city seal. While practicing in Lynn and Boston over a career spanning at least 35 years Wheeler designed structures throughout the Essex County area, including Haverhill, Marblehead, Newburyport, Salem, Swampscott, and Lynn. Wheeler is responsible for a total of five Lynn structures listed on the National Register of Historic Places, more than any other person or firm.

Life
Holman King Wheeler was born October 26, 1859 in Berlin, Massachusetts.  He attended the Massachusetts Institute of Technology, then located in Boston.  He graduated in 1882.  He had worked in the offices of Lynn architects beginning in 1878, and began working on his own by 1883.  In 1884 he formed the firm of Wheeler & Northend in Lynn, with Salem architect W. Wheelwright Northend.  Northend resumed his independent practice around 1893, and Wheeler continued alone.  In 1904 he established a partnership with Charles L. Betton, Wheeler & Betton.  Betton had left by 1914, and Wheeler established Wheeler & Johnson.  By 1919, Wheeler had left the Lynn area, heading south to Boston.  He did at least one project from his office in that city, but had retired to his and his wife's home in Newton by 1920.  Upon his death in 1943, he was buried in Pine Grove Cemetery in Lynn.

Partners

Northend
William Wheelwright Northend was born in 1857 in Salem to later Massachusetts State Senator William Dummer Northend. He was the younger brother to Mary Harrod Northend. Originally intending to practice law, he graduated from Bowdoin College in 1880.  Turning to architecture, he worked for Hartwell & Richardson and Cobb & Frost.  He then attended M. I. T. for a year before studying in Paris.  Prior to establishing a firm with Wheeler, he had opened an office in Salem.  After the firm's dissolution, he practiced alone for a year before his death in 1894.  He was the architect of Swampscott's Phillips High School, opened in 1894 and demolished c.2018. (Sources disagree on whether Northend or Wheeler was the architect.)

Betton
Charles Louis Betton was born in 1870, and died in 1934 in Lynn.  After leaving Wheeler, Betton established his own office.  He designed the Pickering School in 1916 on Conomo Ave, Lynn.  He also did extensive industrial work.

Johnson
The identity of Johnson is currently unknown.

Architectural works

Wheeler & Northend, 1884-1893
 1885 - G. A. R. Hall, 58 Andrew St, Lynn, Massachusetts
 Listed on National Register of Historic Places
 General Frederick W. Lander (for whom the Lynn G.A.R. Post is named) while attending Governor Dummer Academy began a longtime friendship with William Dummer Northend, father of William Wheelwright Northend
 1885 - Grader Block, 3 Pleasant St, Marblehead, Massachusetts
 1886 - John A. Greenwood House, 158 South Common St, Lynn, Massachusetts
 1887 - Sylvanus P. Gardner House, 1 Windsor St, Haverhill, Massachusetts
 1888 - Central Police Station, 18 Sutton St, Lynn, Massachusetts
 Demolished.
 1889 - Lynn Police Department Stables, 28-30 Sutton St, Lynn, Massachusetts
 Demolished.
 1889 - Lynn High School (1892 building), 498 Essex St, Lynn, Massachusetts
 Listed on National Register of Historic Places
 Original building section destroyed by fire on March 29, 1924
 Later the English High School. Now residential units.
 1890 - Myra S. Rowell House, 94 Elmwood Rd, Swampscott, Massachusetts
 1890 - Tapley Building, 206 Broad St, Lynn, Massachusetts
 Listed on National Register of Historic Places
 Burned in 1999.
 1890 - Heffernan Block, 1-5 Exchange St & 402-404 Union St, Lynn, Massachusetts
 Demolished c. 1910 as part of the Lynn Central Square railroad grade separation
 1890 - John S. Earl Building, 9-13 Exchange St & 406-408 Union St, Lynn, Massachusetts
 Also referred to as "Earl's Block"
 Demolished c. 1910 as part of the Lynn Central Square railroad grade separation
 1891 - Oxford Club, 106 Broad St, Lynn, Massachusetts
 Wheeler was a member. The building has been highly altered.
 1891 - Essex County Courthouse (Remodeling), 34 Federal St, Salem, Massachusetts
 c.1891 - Lucien [sic] Newhall Block, 25-35 Central Ave and 30-33 Willow St, Lynn, Massachusetts ("Lucien" is a mis-spelling of "Lucian")
 Demolished. Former location is now the parking lot at the rear of the "flatiron" building, diagonally opposite the Thomas P. Costin Jr. Post Office Building
 1893 - Lynn Armory, 36 South Common St, Lynn, Massachusetts
 Listed on National Register of Historic Places

Holman K. Wheeler, 1893-1904
 1894 - The Phillips School, Greenwood Avenue, Swampscott, Massachusetts 
 Sources disagree on whether Northend or Wheeler was the architect.
 First High School in Swampscott
 Demolished c.2018
 1895 - Naumkeag Building, 203 Essex St, Salem, Massachusetts
 1895 - Hugh E. Murphy Building, Washington St near Monroe St
 1895 - Proctor Building, 31 Exchange St, Lynn, Massachusetts
 1895 - Edward Heffernan Block, 516-520 Washington Street, Lynn, Massachusetts
 Demolished September 2021
 1897 - Henry B. Falls Apartments, 110-120 Broad St, Lynn, Massachusetts
 1900 - Bacheller School, 35 Lynnfield St, Lynn, Massachusetts
 1900 - Jackman School, School St, Newburyport, Massachusetts
 Demolished.
 1901 - Lynn Business College, 112 Exchange St, Lynn, Massachusetts
 1902 - Eugene A. Putnam Apartments, 95 Union St, Lynn, Massachusetts

Wheeler & Betton, 1904-1914
 1904 - High Rock Tower, High Rock Tower Reservation, Lynn, Massachusetts
 Listed on National Register of Historic Places
 1904 - Lennox Building, 184-186 Market St, Lynn, Massachusetts
 Demolished.
 1904 - Littlefield Building, 604 Essex St, Lynn, Massachusetts
 1909 - Goddard Bros. Store, 76 Market St, Lynn, Massachusetts (currently occupied by Zimman's fabrics store)
 1911 - Brewster Apartments, 26 Broad St, Lynn, Massachusetts
 1912 - Arthur Wellington Pinkham (grandson of Lydia Pinkham) House, 311 Western Ave, Lynn, Massachusetts
 Now the Lucia Lighting Company

Wheeler & Johnson, 1914-c.1918
 1915 - English High School (Addition), 498 Essex St, Lynn, Massachusetts
 The James Street wing.
 1915 - Littlefield Building, 604 Essex St, Lynn, Massachusetts (addition)
 1917 - A. J. Mulholland Tannery, 14 Proctor St, Salem, Massachusetts

Holman K. Wheeler, c.1918-1919
 1919 - Dry Storage Building, Chestnut Street, Amesbury, Massachusetts, for Biddle & Smart Co.

Architectural drawings

See also
National Register of Historic Places listings in Lynn, Massachusetts
National Register of Historic Places listings in Essex County, Massachusetts

References

1859 births
1943 deaths
Architects from Massachusetts
Architects from Lynn, Massachusetts
19th-century American people
19th-century American architects